= 東京灣 =

東京灣 or 東京湾 may refer to:

- Gulf of Tonkin, bordering Vietnam and China
- Tokyo Bay, bordering Japan
